Samah Subay is a Yemeni lawyer, working to provide legal support for families who had children 'disappear'. These disappeared are a result of the Yemeni Civil War (2015–present), where many people have been detained, tortured, and held in unknown locations. As a result, families do not know where or when their members are being held or if they are ok.

As a result of her work, Subay has been included in the BBC's list of 100 inspiring and influential women from around the world for 2019.

References 

Living people
Year of birth missing (living people)
Women lawyers
Yemeni lawyers
BBC 100 Women